Mark Swanepoel (born 26 October 1990 in Johannesburg, South Africa) is a rugby union player.

Background

He made his Super Rugby debut for the  during the 2010 Super 14 season and also previously played for Canterbury in New Zealand's ITM Cup.

In October 2012, Swanepoel was named in the Brumbies Extended Playing Squad for the 2013 Super Rugby season.

He is a former Australia Schoolboys and Australia under 20 international.

References

External links
itsrugby.co.uk profile

Rugby union scrum-halves
1990 births
Living people
Rugby union players from Johannesburg
Afrikaner people
South African people of Dutch descent
Western Force players
Canterbury rugby union players
Tasman rugby union players
ACT Brumbies players
Greater Sydney Rams players
South African emigrants to Australia
People educated at the Southport School